The 1980 UCI Track Cycling World Championships were the World Championship for track cycling. They took place in Besançon, France in 1980. Due to the 1980 Summer Olympics only ten events were contested, 8 for men (5 for professionals, 3 for amateurs) and 2 for women.

Medal summary

Medal table

See also
 1980 UCI Road World Championships
 UCI Track Cycling World Championships – Men's keirin

References

Uci Track Cycling World Championships, 1980
Track cycling
UCI Track Cycling World Championships by year
International cycle races hosted by France
Sport in Besançon